Kozlikha is a rural locality (a village) in Kubenskoye Rural Settlement, Kharovsky District, Vologda Oblast, Russia. The population was 35 as of 2002.

Geography 
Kozlikha is located 22 km northwest of Kharovsk (the district's administrative centre) by road. Strelitsa is the nearest rural locality.

References 

Rural localities in Kharovsky District